Swaim House may refer to:

Swaim House (Russellville, Arkansas), listed on the National Register of Historic Places in Pope County, Arkansas
Swaim House (Chapel Hill, Tennessee), listed on the National Register of Historic Places in Marshall County, Tennessee